Foliella is an extinct genus of conodonts in the family Ellisoniidae.

References 

 Significance of Platyvilosus costatus and Foliella gardenae as indicators for the Dienerian-Smithian and Smithian-Spathian boundaries, respectively: a study in the Dolomites (N-Italy). Micha Horacek, Leopold Krystyn and Rainer Brandner, EGU General Assembly 2015, held 12–17 April 2015 in Vienna, Austria.

External links 

 
 Foliella at fossilworks.org (retrieved 22 April 2016)

Prioniodinida genera